Buy Muy Drugs is the debut studio album by Buy Muy Drugs, an American hip hop duo consisting of Denmark Vessey and Azarias. It was released through Ether Jung on September 15, 2017. It includes contributions from Open Mike Eagle, Yasiin Bey, Adad, Quelle Chris, Sassi Blaque, Big Tone, and Billy the Kid.

Critical reception

Marcus J. Moore of Pitchfork wrote, "The album reminds us to stay the course and ignore the nonsense, to find some kind of peace in a world that's become increasingly unstable." Paul Demerritt of Creative Loafing commented that "the brevity allows the group to experiment with a variety of sounds, from Afro-Brazilian rhythms to swells of dissonance and industrial percussion akin to Death Grips." He added, "Radical juxtaposition defines nearly every track, but the group's own sense of taste keeps the album cohesive amid the chaos."

Track listing

Personnel
Credits adapted from liner notes.

 Denmark Vessey – production
 Azarias – production
 Open Mike Eagle – vocals (6)
 Yasiin Bey – vocals (10)
 Adad – vocals (14)
 Billy the Kid – co-production (14)
 Quelle Chris – vocals (16)
 Sassi Blaque – vocals (17)
 Big Tone – vocals (17)
 Brendan Forrest – guitar
 Ra90i – recording
 Josh Berg – recording
 Doug Saltzman – mixing, mastering
 MF NY – cover art

References

2017 debut albums
Hip hop albums by American artists